The United Evangelical Church (Founded as Qua Iboe Church) is a Christian denomination in Nigeria. It has existed since 1887.
It has more than 1,000 congregations and 2,000,000 members. The church was founded by an Irish missionary, Rev. Samuel Alexander Bill the first of many missionaries who served with The Qua Iboe Mission, now known as Mission Africa, which is based in Belfast. The Mission and Church were initially named after the place where the mission began its work, at Ibeno near the Qua Iboe River in the present day Akwa Ibom State of Nigeria. The church and mission have been entirely independent entities since 1984, but the two continue to work together closely.

The church has its headquarters at 28 Nsikak Eduok Avenue, Uyo in Akwa Ibom State. United Evangelical Church is a Bible believing church and does not practice doctrines that do not have any biblical background.

Structure 
The church maintains a four tier structure. There are the local units, each of which is an individual branch overseen by a local pastor, there is a Superintendency which comprises local branches at close proximity to each other and must not be less than 10 units, overseen by a Superintendent. A collection of five or more Superintendencies, makes up an area conference in what can be likened to the diocesan system of other Protestant churches. The assembly of all the area conference including the mission fields, makes up the National Conference and Rev Samuel Udeme Ebukiba  is the current National Chairman of Conference while the General Secretary of the church is Rev. Udo A. Chigbu and its Board of Trustees' Chairman is Elder Joe Abraham (SAN). The National Chairman of Conference (COC) is the spiritual head of the church and oversees gatherings at the National level.

A breakaway group continues to term itself the QIC, but the United Evangelical Church is recognized by Mission Africa as the only true successor of the QIC.

Main administrative branches

Area Conferences 
Aba
Abuja
Ankpa
Ejule
Eket 
Eziala
Ibaji
Idah
Ikemesit
Itam
Kaduna
Mbioto-Mkpat Enin
Ogugu
Ogwe
Olamaboro
Oloko
Ogwolawo

Ukanafun
Umuaro
Uyo

Superintendencies 
Calabar Township
Calabar Municipal
Eleme Township
Lagos Township
Lagos Central
Lokoja
Makurdi
Ondo

Port-Harcourt Township 
Rumuomasi Township
Toto

District 
Benin
Bonny
Enugu 
Oron
Owerri
Warri

Autonomous 
Abak Itenge
Afaha Effiat
Asuna
Ikat Etetuk
Odoro Ikot
Utako

Other Structures 
NATIONAL WORSHIP CENTRE, UTAKO, ABUJA 
MISSION BOARD
PACT
WWTC
HMH
MEN'S FELLOWSHIP
WOMEN'S FELLOWSHIP
YOUTH FELLOWSHIP
ADVANCE
MISSION AFRICA

Annual conference gatherings 
The United Evangelical Church holds its rotatory annual conferences every last quarter of the year; preferably starting from the first week of December each year. This conference is the event where key decisions guiding the church's act for the next year are formulated and it is usually at such conferences that new pastors are ordained pending their induction into the college of ministers. Events at the conferences include: Sessions, Standing Committee and Ministry Committee meetings, the ordination, holy communion and thanksgiving services.

See also 
Christianity in Nigeria

References

External links 
 Official Website

Christian denominations in Nigeria
Charismatic denominations
1887 establishments in the British Empire